Rajendre Khargi (27 July 1955) is a Surinamese journalist and diplomat. He has worked for the Nederlandse Omroep Stichting and Algemeen Nederlands Persbureau among others. He was an advisor and speechwriter for Chan Santokhi. Since 10 February 2021, he serves as Ambassador of Suriname to the Netherlands.

Biography
Khargi was born on 27 July 1955 in Paramaribo. In 1974, he started to work as a radio reporter for the Nederlandse Omroep Stichting. He was the editor of Het Zwarte Schaap, a radio program for Surinamese and Antilleans on Radio 2. In 1984, he became editor in chief for the Algemeen Nederlands Persbureau in Aruba and the Netherlands Antilles. In 2002, he became advisor for the Dutch Minister for Foreign Trade and Development Cooperation.

Khargi was advisor and speechwriter for Chan Santokhi since 2013. Originally, he had a Dutch nationality. In 2020, he changed to a Surinamese citizenship. The last ambassador to the Netherlands was  who served until 2010. President Bouterse did not install new ambassadors, and only appointed chargé d'affaires. In November 2020, Khargi was nominated as Ambassador of Suriname to the Netherlands, and was installed on 10 February 2021.

Honours
 Knight of the Order of Orange-Nassau.

References

Living people
1955 births
People from Paramaribo
Ambassadors of Suriname to the Netherlands
Dutch journalists
Dutch speechwriters
Knights of the Order of Orange-Nassau
Surinamese diplomats